Mikhail Vasilyevich Lomonosov (– ) was a Russian polymath, scientist and writer, who made important contributions to literature, education, and science. Among his discoveries were the atmosphere of Venus and the law of conservation of mass in chemical reactions. His spheres of science were natural science, chemistry, physics, mineralogy, history, art, philology, optical devices and others. The founder of modern geology, Lomonosov was also a poet and influenced the formation of the modern Russian literary language.

Early life and family
Lomonosov was born in the village of Mishaninskaya (later renamed Lomonosovo in his honor) in Archangelgorod Governorate, on an island not far from Kholmogory, in the far north of Russia. His father, Vasily Dorofeyevich Lomonosov, was a prosperous peasant fisherman turned ship owner, who amassed a small fortune transporting goods from Arkhangelsk to Pustozyorsk, Solovki, Kola, and Lapland. Lomonosov's mother was Vasily's first wife, a deacon's daughter, Elena Ivanovna Sivkova.

He remained at Denisovka until he was ten, when his father decided that he was old enough to participate in his business ventures, and Lomonosov began accompanying Vasily on trading missions.

Learning was young Lomonosov's passion, however, not business. The boy's thirst for knowledge was insatiable. Lomonosov had been taught to read as a boy by his neighbor Ivan Shubny, and he spent every spare moment with his books. He continued his studies with the village deacon, S.N. Sabelnikov, but for many years the only books he had access to were religious texts. When he was fourteen, Lomonosov was given copies of Meletius Smotrytsky's Modern Church Slavonic (a grammar book) and Leonty Magnitsky's Arithmetic. Lomonosov was a Russian orthodox all his life, but had close encounters with Old Believers schism in early youth and later in life he became a deist.

In 1724, his father married for the third and final time. Lomonosov and his stepmother Irina had an acrimonious relationship. Unhappy at home and intent on obtaining a higher education, which Lomonosov could not receive in Mishaninskaya, he was determined to leave the village.

Education 

Determined to "study sciences", in 1730, aged nineteen, Lomonosov walked all the way to Moscow. Shortly after arrival, he was admitted into the Slavic Greek Latin Academy by falsely claiming to be a son of a Kholmogory nobleman. In 1734 that initial falsehood, as well as another lie that he was the son of a priest, nearly got him expelled from the academy but the investigation ended without severe consequences.

Lomonosov lived on three kopecks a day, eating only black bread and kvass, but he made rapid progress scholastically. It is believed that in 1735, after three years in Moscow he was sent to Kiev to study for short period at the Kyiv-Mohyla Academy. He quickly became dissatisfied with the education he was receiving there, and returned to Moscow to resume his studies there. In five years Lomonosov completed a twelve-year study course and in 1736, among 12 best graduates, was awarded a scholarship at the St. Petersburg Academy. He plunged into his studies and was rewarded with a four-year grant to study abroad, in Germany, first at the University of Marburg and then in Freiberg.

Education abroad 
The University of Marburg was among Europe's most important universities in the mid-18th century due to the presence of the philosopher Christian Wolff, a prominent figure of the German Enlightenment. Lomonosov became one of Wolff's students while at Marburg from November 1736 to July 1739. Both philosophically and as a science administrator, this connection would be the most influential of Lomonosov's life. In 1739–1740 he studied mineralogy and philosophy at the University of Göttingen; there he intensified his studies of German literature.

Lomonosov quickly mastered the German language, and in addition to philosophy, seriously studied chemistry, discovered the works of 17th century Irish theologian and natural philosopher Robert Boyle, and even began writing poetry. He also developed an interest in German literature. He is said to have especially admired Günther. His Ode on the Taking of Khotin from the Turks, composed in 1739, attracted a great deal of attention in Saint Petersburg. Contrary to his adoration for Wolff, Lomonosov had fierce disputes with Henckel over the training and education courses he and his two compatriot students were getting in Freiberg, as well as over very limited financial support which Henckel was instructed to provide to the Russians after numerous debts they had accumulated in Marburg. As the result, Lomonosov left Freiberg without permission and wandered for quite a while over Germany and Holland, unsuccessfully trying to obtain permission from Russian envoys to return to the St. Petersburg Academy.

During his residence in Marburg, Lomonosov boarded with Catharina Zilch, a brewer's widow. He fell in love with Catharina's daughter Elizabeth Christine Zilch. They were married in June 1740. Lomonosov found it extremely difficult to maintain his growing family on the scanty and irregular allowance granted him by the Russian Academy of Sciences. As his circumstances became desperate, he got permission to return to Saint Petersburg.

Return to Russia 
Lomonosov returned to Russia in June 1741, after being abroad 4 years and 8 months.  A year later he was named an Adjunct of the Russian Academy of Science in the physics department. In May 1743, Lomonosov was accused, arrested, and held under house arrest for eight months, after he supposedly insulted various people associated with the academy. He was released and pardoned in January 1744 after apologising to all involved.

Lomonosov was made a full member of the academy, and named Professor of chemistry, in 1745. He established the academy's first chemistry laboratory. Eager to improve Russia's educational system, in 1755, Lomonosov joined his patron Count Ivan Shuvalov in founding Moscow University.

In 1760, he was elected a Foreign Member of the Royal Swedish Academy of Sciences. In 1764, he was elected Foreign Member of the Academy of Sciences of the Institute of Bologna In 1764, Lomonosov was appointed to the position of the State Councillor which was of Rank V in the Russian Empire's Table of Ranks. He died on 4 April (o.s.), 1765 in Saint Petersburg.  He is widely and deservingly regarded as the "Father of Russian Science", though many of his scientific accomplishments were relatively unknown outside Russia until long after his death and gained proper appreciation only in late 19th and, especially, 20th centuries.

Science and inventions

Physics

In 1756, Lomonosov tried to replicate Robert Boyle's experiment of 1673. He concluded that the commonly accepted phlogiston theory was false. Anticipating the discoveries of Antoine Lavoisier, he wrote in his diary: "Today I made an experiment in hermetic glass vessels in order to determine whether the mass of metals increases from the action of pure heat. The experiments – of which I append the record in 13 pages – demonstrated that the famous Robert Boyle was deluded, for without access of air from outside the mass of the burnt metal remains the same".

That is the Law of Mass Conservation in chemical reaction, which is well-known today as "in a chemical reaction, the mass of reactants is equal to the mass of the products." Lomonosov, together with Lavoisier, is regarded as the one who discovered the law of mass conservation.

He stated that all matter is composed of corpuscles – molecules that are "collections" of elements – atoms. In his dissertation "Elements of Mathematical Chemistry" (1741, unfinished), the scientist gives the following definition: "An element is a part of a body that does not consist of any other smaller and different bodies ... corpuscle is a collection of elements forming one small mass." In a later study (1748), he uses the term "atom" instead of "element", and "particula" (particle) or "molecule" instead of "corpuscle".

He regarded heat as a form of motion, suggested the wave theory of light, contributed to the formulation of the kinetic theory of gases, and stated the idea of conservation of matter in the following words: "All changes in nature are such that inasmuch is taken from one object insomuch is added to another. So, if the amount of matter decreases in one place, it increases elsewhere. This universal law of nature embraces laws of motion as well, for an object moving others by its own force in fact imparts to another object the force it loses" (first articulated in a letter to Leonhard Euler dated 5 July 1748, rephrased and published in Lomonosov's dissertation "Reflexion on the solidity and fluidity of bodies", 1760).

Astronomy

Lomonosov was the first to discover and appreciate the atmosphere of Venus during his observation of the transit of Venus of 1761 in a small observatory near his house in St Petersburg.

On 5 and 6 June 2012, a group of astronomers carried out an experimental reconstruction of Lomonosov's discovery of the Venusian atmosphere with antique refractors during the transit of Venus. They concluded that Lomonosov's telescope was fully adequate to the task of detecting the arc of light around Venus off the Sun's disc during ingress or egress if proper experimental techniques as described by Lomonosov in his 1761 paper were employed.

In 1762, Lomonosov presented an improved design of a reflecting telescope to the Russian Academy of Sciences forum. His telescope had its primary mirror adjusted at an angle of four degrees to the telescope's axis. This made the image focus at the side of the telescope tube, where the observer could view the image with an eyepiece without blocking the image. However, this invention was not published until 1827, so this type of telescope has become associated with a similar design by William Herschel, the Herschelian telescope.

Chemistry and geology 
In 1759, with his collaborator, academician Joseph Adam Braun, Lomonosov was the first person to record the freezing of mercury and to carry out initial experiments with it. Believing that nature is subject to regular and continuous evolution, he demonstrated the organic origin of soil, peat, coal, petroleum and amber. In 1745, he published a catalogue of over 3,000 minerals, and in 1760, he explained the formation of icebergs.

In 1763, he published On The Strata of the Earth – his most significant geological work. This work puts him before James Hutton, who has been traditionally regarded as the founder of modern geology. Lomonosov based his conceptions on the unity of the Earth's processes in time, and necessity to explain the planet's past from present.

Geography
Lomonosov's observation of iceberg formation led into his pioneering work in geography. Lomonosov got close to the theory of continental drift, theoretically predicted the existence of Antarctica (he argued that icebergs of the South Ocean could be formed only on a dry land covered with ice), and invented sea tools which made writing and calculating directions and distances easier. In 1764, he organized an expedition (led by Admiral Vasili Chichagov) to find the Northeast Passage between the Atlantic and Pacific oceans by sailing along the northern coast of Siberia.

Mechanic 

The idea of a coaxial rotor originated from Mikhail Lomonosov. In July 1754, he developed a model of a small helicopter with a coaxial rotor and demonstrated it to the Russian Academy of Sciences.

Mosaic 

Lomonosov was proud to restore the ancient art of mosaics. In 1754, in his letter to Leonhard Euler, he wrote that his three years of experiments on the effects of chemistry of minerals on their colour led to his deep involvement in the mosaic art. In 1763, he set up a glass factory that produced the first stained glass mosaics outside of Italy. There were forty mosaics attributed to Lomonosov, with only twenty-four surviving to the present day.

Grammarian, poet, historian
In 1755 Lomonosov wrote a grammar that reformed the Russian literary language by combining Old Church Slavonic with the vernacular tongue. To further his literary theories, he wrote more than 20 solemn ceremonial odes, notably the Evening Meditation on God's Grandeur. He applied an idiosyncratic theory to his later poems – tender subjects needed words containing the front vowel sounds E, I, Y and U, whereas things that may cause fear (like "anger", "envy", "pain" and "sorrow") needed words with back vowel sounds O, U and Y. That was a version of what is now called sound symbolism.

In 1760 Lomonosov published a History of Russia. In addition, he attempted to write a grand epic about Peter the Great, to be based on the Aeneid by Vergil, but he died before he could finish it.

Legacy

His granddaughter Sophia Konstantinova (1769–1844) married Russian military hero and statesman General Nikolay Raevsky. His great-granddaughter was Princess Maria (Raevskaya) Volkonskaya, the wife of the Decembrist Prince Sergei Volkonsky.

The city of Lomonosov, Russia (former Oranienbaum, Russia from 1710 to 1948), and a lunar crater bear his name, as does a crater on Mars and the asteroid 1379 Lomonosowa. A Russian satellite launched in 2016 was named Mikhailo Lomonosov after him. The Imperial Porcelain Factory, Saint Petersburg was renamed after him from 1925 to 2005. In 1948, the underwater Lomonosov Ridge in the Arctic Ocean was named in his honor.

Lomonosov Bridge in Saint Petersburg was named after the polymath. Originally called Tchernyshov Bridge (Chernyshev Bridge) in honour of  one of Peter the Great's most prominent generals, whose estates were located nearby, the bridge was erected in 1785−1987, and replaced a wooden bridge which had previously stood at the site. It was one of seven moveable stone bridges of similar design crossing the Fontanka River, built simultaneously with the river's granite embankments. Only Lomonosov Bridge and Staro-Kalinkin Bridge have survived more or less intact.

Moscow's Domodedovo airport is officially named after Lomonosov.

The Lomonosov Gold Medal was established in 1959 and is awarded annually by the Russian Academy of Sciences to a Russian and a foreign scientist.

Lomonosovskaya Station on the Nevsko-Vasileostrovskaya Line of the Saint Petersburg Metro is named after him. It was opened in 1970.

The street "Lomonosova iela" in the Maskavas Forštate district of Riga is named in honor of Lomonosov. During the Soviet era, a main street in Tallinn, Estonia, was named in his honor as "M. Lomonossovi", but from 1991, the year when Estonia restored its independence, the street was renamed  after Jakob Johann Gonsior, a 19th-century alderman and lawyer.

In Dnipro, Ukraine, a statue to honour Lomonosov stood between 1919 and 2023. In 1919, the statue to Catherine the Great was removed from the pedestal, and the Lomonosov statue replaced that of the empress. On 6 January 2023, the Lomonosov statue was removed by the city of Dnipro because of Russia's full-scale invasion into Ukraine that began on 24 February 2022 in the wider Russo-Ukrainian War that Russia started in 2014.

On 19 November 2011, Google celebrated his 300th birthday with a Google Doodle.

A great number of different stamps was issued in honor of Lomonosov throughout the years: Mikhail Lomonosov and the Academy of Sciences building in Leningrad stamp of 1925, stamps depicting Lomonosov issued in 1949, in 1956 and in 1961, a 275th Birth Anniversary of M.V.Lomonosov stamp of 1986, a History of Russia (Ekaterina II) stamp depicting Lomonosov and his study room talking to the queen that was issued in 2004, three 300th Anniversary of the Birth of M.V.Lomonosov stamps were issued in 2011.

The Akademik Lomonosov, the first of a series of Russian floating nuclear power stations, is named after him. It started operation on 19 December 2019.

Moscow State University, founded by him in 1755, was renamed M. V. Lomonosov Moscow State University  in 1940, while celebrating its 185th anniversary. There are also Moscow Institute of Mechanics and Electrical Engineering M.V. Lomonosov (Lomonosov Institute), Lomonosov Institute of Geochemistry, Mineralogy and Petrography, USSR Academy of Sciences in Moscow, Lomonosov Northern (Arctic) Federal University, Odessa Technological Institute of Food Industry n.a. M.V. Lomonosov, Moscow State University of Fine Chemical Technologies n.a. M.V. Lomonosov, and several other schools in Russia and Kazakhstan.

On 19 November 1986, on the 275th anniversary of the birth of M.V. Lomonosov, the USSR State Bank issued a 1 ruble commemorative coin from a copper-nickel alloy.

On 6 December 2022, the City Council of the Ukrainian city Dnipro decided to remove from the city all monuments to figures of Russian culture and history, in particular it was mentioned that the monuments to Lomonosov, Alexander Pushkin and Maxim Gorky would be removed from the public space of the city.

Works

English translations
 
 
 
 
 
 
 

German translations

See also

 Christian Wolff (philosopher)
 Dmitry Ivanovich Vinogradov
 Franz Aepinus
 Gerhard Friedrich Müller
 Ivan Kulibin
 Jean-Baptiste Chappe d'Auteroche
 Johann Daniel Schumacher
 Joseph-Nicolas Delisle
 Northern (Arctic) Federal University
 Stepan Krasheninnikov
 Stepan Rumovsky
 Vasily Trediakovsky

References

Citations

Sources

Further reading
 
 
 
 
 
 
 
 Peter Hoffmann: Michail Vasil'evič Lomonosov (1711–1765). Ein Enzyklopädist im Zeitalter der Aufklärung. Frankfurt am Main: Peter Lang, 2011. 
 Norbert Nail (March 2012): Russi intra muros: Studenten aus Sankt Petersburg 1736–1739 bei Christian Wolff in Marburg. Zum 300. Geburtstag des Universalgelehrten Michail Vasil'evič Lomonosov am 19. November 2011. In: Studenten-Kurier 1/2012, pp. 15–19. 
 Steven Usitalo (2013): The Invention of Mikhail Lomonosov (A Russian National Myth), Academic Studies Press. 
 M.W. Lomonossow in Freiberg. Herausgegeben anlässlich der Einweihung des Lomonossow-Hauses in der Freiberger Fischerstraße am 7. Februar 2014 (russisch u. deutsch). Freiberg: TU Bergakademie 2014. (Darin: F. Naumann, Michail Wassiljewitsch Lomonossows Weg in die Wissenschaft; F. Naumann, Das Lomonossow-Haus und seine Geschichte; C. Drebenstedt / B. Meyer, Deutsch-Russische Montanbeziehungen im Wandel der Zeit]. [Russian and German]
 R.Crease and V.Shiltsev, "Mikhail Lomonosov (1711–1765): Scientist in Politically Turbulent Times" in Il Nuovo Saggiatore, vol. 33, issue 5–6 (2017), pp. 43–56 https://web.archive.org/web/20180130092120/https://www.ilnuovosaggiatore.sif.it/issue/54
 Robert Crease / Vladimir Shiltsev: Fueling Peter's Mill: Mikhail Lomonosov's Educational Training in Russia and Germany, 1731–1741. In: Physics in Perspective, Vol. 20, Issue 3, September 2018, pp. 272–304.

External links

 Сайт о М.В. Ломоносове  – жизнь, научная деятельность, творчество, историческая родина, туризм на родину Ломоносова, 300-летний юбилей М.В. Ломоносова 
 Lomonosov and His Time –  electronic collection at the Russian Academy of Sciences website 
 Illustrated chronology of Lomonosov's life
 Evening Meditation on the Greatness of God on the occasion of the Northern Lights
 
 Kutateladze S.S. The Mathematical Background of Lomonosov's Contribution 
 Lomonosov's matriculation, Marburg 17 November 1736 
 Lomonosov's Passport, Marburg 13 May 1741

1711 births
1765 deaths
18th-century writers from the Russian Empire
18th-century male writers
18th-century scientists from the Russian Empire
18th-century painters from the Russian Empire
18th-century poets from the Russian Empire
Enlightenment scientists
Linguists from Russia
People from Kholmogorsky District
People from Archangelgorod Governorate
Russian astronomers
Russian deists
Russian chemists
Russian geographers
Grammarians from Russia
18th-century historians from the Russian Empire
Russian inventors
Linguists of Russian
Russian male poets
Russian male writers
Russian paleogeographers
Russian philosophers
Russian physicists
Russian encyclopedists
Academic staff of Saint Petersburg State University
Full members of the Saint Petersburg Academy of Sciences
National University of Kyiv-Mohyla Academy alumni
Members of the Royal Swedish Academy of Sciences
Transit of Venus
Enlightenment philosophers
Burials at Lazarevskoe Cemetery (Saint Petersburg)